1942 is a year.

1942 may also refer to:

 1942 (video game), video game made by Capcom
 1942: Joint Strike, downloadable game for Xbox Live Arcade & PlayStation Network
1942 (board game), a 1978 board wargame about the World War II Pacific Theatre
 1942: A Love Story, 1994 Hindi movie
 1942 (EP), a 2001 EP release from Soul-Junk
 1942 (novel), an alternate history novel written by Robert Conroy
 "1942" (song), a 2018 song by G-Eazy
 "1942", a song by PartyNextDoor from PartyNextDoor 3